Benjamin Hugh Higgins (born 8 March 1972) is an Australian cricketer. He played in fifteen first-class and seven List A matches for South Australia between 2000 and 2003.

See also
 List of South Australian representative cricketers

References

External links
 

1972 births
Living people
Australian cricketers
South Australia cricketers
Cricketers from Adelaide
Sportsmen from South Australia